Ngiri may refer to
 Ngiri, Kenya, a settlement in Kenya's Nyanza Province
 Ngiri Reserve, a protected area of the Democratic Republic of the Congo
 Ngiri River, a tributary of the Ubangi River in the Democratic Republic of the Congo
 Ngiri-Ngiri, a municipality (commune) in the Funa district of Kinshasa
 Ngondi–Ngiri languages, a clade of Bantu languages